This is a list of horror films released in 1987.

References

Sources

 

 
 
 

 

Lists of horror films by year
Horror